Sheldon is an unincorporated community in Houston County, in the U.S. state of Minnesota.

History
A post office was established at Sheldon in 1856, and remained in operation until it was discontinued in 1903. The community was named for one of its founders, Julius C. Sheldon.

References

Unincorporated communities in Houston County, Minnesota
Unincorporated communities in Minnesota